Kaya Futbol Club–Iloilo (also known as Una Kaya Futbol Club, Inc.,) is a Filipino professional football club based in Iloilo City. They play in the Philippines Football League (PFL), the highest tier of football in the Philippines. The club has won one UFL cup and two Copa Paulino Alcantara, and has also competed in the AFC Champions League and AFC Cup.

Founded in 1996 as Kaya Futbol Club in Makati, the club's name comes from the Filipino word káya ("we can"). While in Old Tagalog, the word is defined as susi ng kapatiran ("key to brotherhood").  Both of these definitions provide the basis for Kaya's team spirit and vision. The club was a founding member of the United Football League (UFL)—the de facto top-level league of Philippine football back then. They played in the UFL throughout its existence from 2010 to 2016. In 2017, the club changed its name to Kaya F.C.–Makati upon joining the PFL, the official top flight of Philippine football. In 2018, they relocated to Iloilo City and changed their name accordingly.

History
Kaya Futbol Club traces its origins to the late 1980s and early 1990s, when men played football in a wooden basketball court at the old Makati campus of the International School Manila (ISM) in present-day Century City, Makati.

In July 1996, Kaya was officially established by Chris Hagedorn, ISM football coach Bob Kovach, and former national team players Rudy del Rosario, and John-Rey "Lupoy" Bela-ong. Chris Hagedorn once pointed out that the name "Kaya" is derived from the Filipino word for "can do it" or "we can". Kaya co-founder Rudy del Rosario points to the lyrics of Bob Marley's song Kaya, when asked about the origin of the club's name.

The club began to join outdoor 7-a-side football tournaments playing against other teams, frequently making podium-finishes in these competitions.

In the late 1990s, Kaya participated in official and more challenging 11-a-side football tournaments organized by the National Capital Region Football Association. In the early 2000s, the club played in numerous competitions like the Globe Super Cup. In 2002, the club played in the first incarnation of the United Football League.

Between 2000 and 2009, Kaya defeated the Philippine Armed Forces clubs in two separate championship matches and was the champion of the old incarnation of the United Football League (UFL) on three occasions. The club was eventually recognized as one of the only club teams capable of defeating the "big three", composed of the Philippine Army, Philippine Air Force and Philippine Navy football clubs.

Before the club participated in the inaugural UFL Cup in 2009, the CEO of LBC Express Santiago Araneta began investing on the club, helping Kaya to become one of the finest clubs in the Philippines.

United Football League

2010 season
After placing in the top two of their group in the first ever UFL Cup in October 2009, Kaya was placed in the first division for the inaugural United Football League competition.

In the inaugural season of the United Football League, Kaya finished second, behind league champions Philippine Air Force. The club had a final record of 28 points (9 wins, 1 draw, and 4 losses in 14 games). The runner-up finish is Kaya's best finish in the league, which was replicated by the team in the 2012 season.

2011 season
Kaya withdrew from this season's UFL Cup for unspecified reasons. As a result, the club was fined ₱200,000

The club signed Spanish coach Juan Cutillas as the club's head coach in 2011. The club went on to finish fourth in the league competition after collecting 17 points (5 wins, 2 draws, and 5 losses in 12 games).

2012 season
This season's UFL Cup saw the beginning of the fierce rivalry between Kaya and the Loyola Meralco Sparks. After placing top of their group with an unbeaten record, Kaya defeated Team Socceroo 2–0 in the round of sixteen. Kaya then defeated the Manila Nomads 3–0 in the quarterfinals, setting up a showdown with the Loyola Meralco Sparks in the semi-finals. Kaya lead the game 3–0, but a resilient Loyola Meralco Sparks club managed to make an exciting comeback, finishing the game at 4–5 to the Sparks. With the loss, Kaya was placed in a third-place match with Global, losing 2–1.

Before the beginning of the league competition, head coach Juan Cutillas left the club. He was replaced by Filipino coach Michael Alvarez as the interim head coach of the club.

The 2012 league competition saw one of Kaya's best finishes to date, finishing runners-up to champions Global. The two clubs finished with the same record (42 points with 13 wins, 3 draws, and 2 losses in 18 games). The championship was then decided on goal-difference, with Global having a +32 GD and Kaya with +13 GD. With the runners-up finish, Kaya missed out on qualifying for the 2013 AFC President's Cup.

2013 season
Kaya joined its first PFF National Men's Club Championship. In the round of sixteen, they defeated M'lang 5–0 in Koronadal. The club beat rivals Loyola Meralco Sparks 1–0 in the quarterfinals, before falling to eventual champions Ceres 3–1 in the semi-finals. In the third-place match, Kaya defeated Green Archers United 2–0.

In the UFL Cup, Kaya finished the group stages in second place, behind Green Archers United on goal difference. They were defeated by Global 2–1 at extra time in the quarterfinals.

Head coach Michael Alvarez stepped down as head coach in December 2012. he was replaced by Uruguayan coach Maor Rozen.

Kaya finished fourth in the league competition with 31 points (8 wins, 7 draws, and 3 losses in 18 games), 15 points from champions Stallion. In the middle of the league, head coach Maor Rozen resigned after just three matches in charge. The club's goalkeeping coach Melo Sabacan took over the reins as interim head coach, and was subsequently replaced by Australian coach David Perković.

2014 season
The club saw minimal success in this season's UFL Cup. Kaya finished second in their group, behind UFL Division 2 side Union Internacional Manila. They then lost to recently relegated Philippine Air Force 1–0 in the round of sixteen.

The league competition saw Kaya finish third with 46 points (14 wins, 4 draws, and 6 losses in 24 games), 3 points behind rivals Loyola Meralco Sparks and 16 points behind league champions Global. Before the season ended, head coach David Perković announced that he will not be renewing his contract with the club and that his last match will be the derby between Kaya and the Loyola Meralco Sparks.

In the UFL FA Cup, the culmination competition of the season, Kaya were beaten 3–1 by Global in the finals. Thomas Taylor was the competition's top goal-scorer with five goals.

2015 season
In the pre-season, it was announced by the club that American Adam Reekie will replace David Perković as the club's new head coach.

Kaya failed to get past the group stages of the PFF National Men's Club Championship, but were able to top their group in the inaugural UFL FA League Cup. The club fell to rivals Loyola Meralco Sparks 2–1 in the quarterfinals. Louis Max Clark was named as one of the competition's top goal-scorers with 10 goals in 7 games.

The club finished fourth in the league with 31 points (10 wins, 1 draw, 6 losses in 17 games),12 points behind champions Ceres. In the middle of the league competition, head coach Adam Reekie announced his resignation. In June 2015, former Kaya player Fabien Lewis was appointed by the club as interim head coach.

With the eventual departure of Fabien Lewis, Kaya player Chris Greatwich became the club's interim head coach during the UFL Cup. Kaya finished the group stages at the top of the table. The club defeated the Manila Nomads 10–1 in the round of sixteen, and then defeated JP Voltes 8–0 in the quarterfinals. In their semi-final clash against Stallion, Kaya came from behind three times to put the game at 3–3 at extra time. Kaya won the game 5–4 in penalties after goalkeeper Nick O'Donnell denied Ian Araneta, bringing Kaya to its first UFL Cup finals appearance. The final was held on August 28, 2015. The game went to penalties after the game finished at 2–2 at extra time. Nick O'Donnel denied Ceres twice and Louis Clark slotted in the winning penalty to give Kaya a 4–2 win in the penalty shootout and the club's first major silverware. With the championship win, Kaya qualified for a play-off spot in the 2016 AFC Cup, the club's first international competition in history. Striker Tishan Hanley was given the golden boot for his 15 goals in the UFL Cup.

2016 season
Kaya officially celebrates their 20th founding anniversary this season.

During pre-season, it was announced by the club that Kaya FC Academy Director and former Philippine Azkal and Kaya player Chris Greatwich has been officially appointed as the club's new head coach.

Before the 2016 AFC Cup draw in December 2015, it was announced that Kaya would be given a direct berth to the group stages of the AFC Cup instead of having to play in a play-off match. This was the result of FIFA's suspension of Indonesia's football association, effectively freeing up slots in the group stages.

On February 23, 2016, Kaya played their maiden AFC Cup game against Hong Kong Premier League side Kitchee in Hong Kong, where they lost 1–0. On March 8, 2016, Kaya earned their first three points in an international competition with their dramatic 1–0 win against the Maldives' New Radiant in Manila. The win marks many milestones in the club's 20-year history, including their first points, first win, and first home game in an international competition. A week after their famous victory, Kaya defeated S.League side Balestier Khalsa 1–0 at home. The win marks the first time a Filipino football club won more than once in the group stages of the AFC Cup. On April 12, 2016, Kaya once again defeated Balestier Khalsa 3–0 in Singapore. The historical result marks the club's first ever win away from home and also first points earned away from home in an international competition.

Philippines Football League (2017-present)

After the announcement of the establishment of Philippines Football League as the country's new top-tier league, in November 2016, Kaya was confirmed to be one of the first teams to compete in the inaugural season of the league. Kaya adopted the name "Kaya FC-Makati and set their home ground to University of Makati Stadium with 4,000 seating capacity. For the inaugural season, Kaya finished third in the regular season and lost to Ceres-Negros in the semi-final of the Final series.

In January 2018, it was reported that Kaya that plans to move its home venue to the Iloilo Sports Complex in La Paz, Iloilo City. On 6 February 2018, Kaya transferred from Makati to Iloilo with the signing of a memorandum of agreement between club officials and the provincial government of Iloilo. The team changed their name to Kaya FC–Iloilo.

Kaya later secured a return to Asian club football after it won over the Davao Aguilas in the final of the 2018 Copa Paulino Alcantara and qualified for the 2019 AFC Cup.

In the 2020 PFL, Kaya finished undefeated in the shortened season with 3 wins and 2 draws. In their final league match, they ended the two-year unbeaten run of their rivals United City (formerly Ceres). In 2021, they competed in the AFC Champions League for the first time, but were winless in group stage. Nonetheless, Marwin Angeles became the first player from a Filipino club to score in the AFC Champions League. Later that year, they won their second Copa Paulino Alcantara.

Crest and colors

The colors of Kaya's crest (red, green, yellow and black) are mainly based on the pan-African colors that are associated with Rastafari. This is due to the heavy influence of Reggae on the club's founding members' lives.
The 31 stars on the crest is a tribute to club co-founder John-Rey "Lupoy" Bela-ong, with each star signifying every year of his life. Bela-ong died at the age of 31 in 2002, when he was stabbed to death while exiting a bus in Quezon City. At that time, he was carrying the material for Kaya's team uniforms, which were then stolen by his killers.

In 2017, Kaya launched their new logos, with the only major changes being the words "Makati City" instead of the club's founding year put on the bottom of the crest. The team's founding year, 1996, has instead been put inside the ball of the crest, also at the bottom. When the club transferred to Iloilo City, the logo had a minor revision with the text "Makati City" changed to "Iloilo", the new home province of the club.

Sponsors

1 Major shirt sponsor (names located at the front of the shirt).
2 Secondary sponsor (names mostly located at the back of the shirt).

Support and rivalries
The Ultras Kaya, also known as the Sons of Mighty Kaya, was the official supporters group of Kaya and were the pioneers of ultras culture in the Philippine football scene. The group was established in 2011 when one of the members of the Don Bosco United Futsal Club Supporters or the Futsaldiers teamed up with two members of the Kaholeros (one of the Philippine Azkals' supporters group). The group was recognized by the club as its official supporters group soon after. The Ultras Kaya cheers in the upper-left side of the Rizal Memorial Stadium's grandstand, a section they call "The Terraces". Philippine club football fans and players alike have referred to the Ultras Kaya as the best supporters group in the country. However, Ultras Kaya felt the club abandoned them as Kaya FC silently moved to Iloilo without any talks given to its supporting fans, even stating that moving to Iloilo are just rumors and not true. Club even denied the alleged move, although photos and new crest were already leaked through different football communities. Other members may still watch the matches in Manila, but the old form of Ultras Kaya is nowhere near to its previous years. Some of the Ultras group even named those who stand against the Clubs decision, "The Ultras without a Club" sighting a positive and negative views of whether it is a class act or showing no respect. Ultras Kaya was never been the same again since then.

When Kaya was still based in Manila, the club had rivalries with a number of teams in the UFL. In 2010, they had a fierce rivalry with Union Internacional Manila, but since the club decided to be voluntarily relegated to the UFL Division 2, this rivalry has mostly died out. Since 2011, Kaya held a rivalry with National Capital Region neighbors Loyola Meralco Sparks, with Kaya hailing from the city of Makati in the south of Metro Manila and Loyola Meralco Sparks being based in Quezon City in the north. The rivalry began in the 2011 UFL Cup semi-finals clash between the two teams, in which Kaya went up to lead the game by 3–0 only to lose by 4–5 after an enthralling comeback from the Sparks. Since then, the UFL has had some of its highest attendance numbers whenever there are match-ups between the two teams, making the rivalry the most famous derby in Philippine club football.

This rivalry continued into the first season of the newly founded Philippine Football League. However, after the first season of the PFL concluded, Meralco then decided to pull out of the league, effectively ending the rivalry between the two clubs.

Players

First-team squad

Staff and management

List of head coaches

Honors

Domestic

League
 Philippines Football League
 Runners-up: 2018, 2019, 2020
 United Football League Division 1 Runners-up: 2010, 2012

Cups
 Copa Paulino Alcantara Winners: 2018, 2021
 Runners-up: 2019, 2022
 UFL Cup Winners: 2015
 UFL FA Cup Runners-up: 2014

Records

Continental recordAFC club ranking'''

Kaya F.C. Women

The Kaya F.C. women's team was founded in 2019. The seven-a-side team competed in the inaugural season of the 7's Football League Women's Division, where they finished runners-up.

Notes

References

External links

Kaya FC
Kaya FC
Association football clubs established in 1996
1996 establishments in the Philippines
Sport in Makati
Sport in Iloilo City